The 1986 CONCACAF Champions' Cup was the 22nd edition of the annual international club football competition held in the CONCACAF region (North America, Central America and the Caribbean), the CONCACAF Champions' Cup. It determined that year's club champion of association football in the CONCACAF region and was played from 22 March 1986 till 11 February 1987.

The teams were split in 2 zones, North/Central America and Caribbean, (as North and Central America sections combined to qualify one team for the final), each one qualifying two teams to the final tournament. All the matches in the tournament were played under the home/away match system.

The North/Central American section was split too in 3 zones, North, Central 1 and Central 2, the winner of Central 1 directly qualifying to the final tournament, while the winners of North and Central 2, had to play an Intermediate round for the second spot. The Caribbean section was split in 2 zones, North and South group, qualifying one team from each group to the final tournament.

Costa Rican team Liga Deportiva Alajuelense defeated Surinamese Transvaal 6–2 on aggregate, becoming CONCACAF champions for the first time in their history.

North/Central American Zone

Northern Group

First round

Club Verdes (on a bye) and Pembroke Hamilton Club advanced to the second round.

Second round

Pembroke Hamilton Club advances to Intermediate round.

Central Group 1

First round

Alajuelense and Alianza advance to the second round.

Second round

Alajuelense advances to the CONCACAF Semi-Finals.

Central Group 2

First round

Comunicaciones and Motagua advance to the second round.

Second round

Motagua advances to Intermediate round.

Intermediate Round

Pembroke Hamilton Club advances to the CONCACAF Semi-Finals.

Caribbean Zone

Caribbean Group North

First round

Moulien and Trintoc advance to the second round.

Second round

Trintoc advance to the third round.

Third round

Trintoc advances to the CONCACAF Semi-Finals.

Caribbean Group South

First round

UNDEBA on a bye, to the second round.
Transvaal advances to the second round.
Robinhood on a bye, to the third round.

Second round

Transvaal advances to the third round.

Third round

Transvaal advances to the CONCACAF Semi-Finals.

Semi-finals 

Alajuelense and Transvaal advances to the CONCACAF Final.

Finals

First leg

Second leg 

 Alajuelense won 4–0 on points, (6–2 on aggregate).

Champion

References

c
1
c